Winiarski is a Polish surname. Notable people with the surname include:

 Bohdan Winiarski (1884-1969), Polish politician and jurist
 Ed Winiarski, American comic book writer
 Leon Winiarski (1865-1915), Polish sociologist
 Michał Winiarski (born 1983), Polish volleyball player
 Warren Winiarski (born 1928), American winemaker

Polish-language surnames